RIGS may refer to:

 Regionally Important Geological Site
 Ryukyu Islands Girl Scouts
 RIGS: Mechanized Combat League